Parasyrinx is a genus of extinct sea snails, marine gastropod mollusks unassigned in the superfamily Conoidea.

Species
Species within the genus Parasyrinx include:
 † Parasyrinx alta (G. F. Harris, 1897) 
 † Parasyrinx anomala (Powell, 1942) 
 † Parasyrinx powelli P. A. Maxwell, 1992 
 † Parasyrinx subalta (P. Marshall & Murdoch, 1919) 
Synonyms
 † Parasyrinx (Lirasyrinx) powelli P. A. Maxwell, 1992: synonym of † Parasyrinx powelli P. A. Maxwell, 1992 
 † Parasyrinx finlayi R. S. Allan, 1926: synonym of † Cochlespira maorum (P. Marshall & Murdoch, 1923)

References

External links
 Finlay H. J. (1924). The molluscan fauna of Target Gully: Part 1. Transactions of the New Zealand Institute. 55: 495-516
 Powell, A. W. B. (1942). The New Zealand Recent and fossil Mollusca of the family Turridae with general notes on turrid nomenclature and systematics. Bulletin of the Auckland Institute and Museum. 2: 1-188, 14 pls.

Conoidea